WLLI (102.3 FM) is a radio station broadcasting a country music format. Licensed to Munfordville, Kentucky, United States, the station serves the Bowling Green area. The station is currently owned by Royse Radio, Inc.

History
The station first signed on the air as WLOC-FM on August 1, 1964. On April 2, 1979, it began broadcasting a Variety format, featuring a mix of country and adult contemporary music. The station became solely a Hot AC-formatted station when the callsign became WMCC on January 30, 1996. It was acquired by Jacor in 1997. The station changed its call sign to WCLU-FM in May 1998, two months after being acquired by its current owner, Royse Radio, Inc., to match that of Glasgow-based sister station WCLU. The adult contemporary format remained with the station.

On April 1, 2021, WCLU-FM rebranded as "Beaver 102.3/98.5" and changed its call sign to WBVA, using similar imaging to Forever Communications's WBVR-FM in Bowling Green.

On February 1, 2022, the station changed its call sign to WLLI. On February 4, 2022, WLLI changed its format from country to a simulcast of classic country-formatted WLYE-FM 94.1 FM Glasgow, branded as "Willie Country".

References

External links

LLI
Radio stations established in 1965
1965 establishments in Kentucky
Country radio stations in the United States